Fatemeh Emdadian (Persian: فاطمه امدادیان) (born 1955 in Tabriz) is a contemporary Iranian sculptor based in Mehrshahr, Karaj, Iran. She often sculpts with wood, bronze and casts.

Biography 
In 1976 she graduated from Behzad School of Fine Arts, Tehran with a B.A. in sculpture.

Emdadian is married to painter, Behrouz Moslemian and together they have two daughters.

In 2002 she was awarded the Tehran Sculpture Biennial's 4th place juried award, held at the Niavaran Cultural Center Gallery. Her work featured in this exhibition were wooden sculptures shaped similar to an angle's wing, arranged in groupings.

In 2009 she participated in The Masques of Shahrazad art exhibition with 28 Iranian women artist, surveying three decades at Candlestar Gallery in London. Her artwork, with other artists, was part of the Disappeared statues in Tehran, 2010.

See also
 Culture of Iran
 Islamic art
 Iranian art
 List of Iranian artists

References 

1955 births
Living people
20th-century Iranian women artists
21st-century Iranian women artists
Iranian sculptors
Iranian women sculptors
People from Tabriz
People from Karaj